is a town located in Katsuta District, Okayama Prefecture, Japan. , the town had an estimated population of 5,738 in 1512 households and a population density of 83 persons per km².

Geography
Nagi is located in the northeastern part of Okayama Prefecture, bordered by Tottori Prefecture to the north. Located on the southern side of the Chugoku Mountains, mountains and forests occupy the northern town area; and the town is designated as a heavy snowfall area. Mount Nagi (1255 meters) from which the town derives its name, is located on the border between Nagi and Chizu, Tottori. The southern part of the city is a plateau called the Nihonbaru Plateau, where the Ground Self-Defense Force Camp Nihonbara and the Nihonbara Maneuver Area are located.

Neighboring  municipalities 
Okayama Prefecture
Tsuyama
Mimasaka
Shōō
Tottori Prefecture
Chizu

Climate
Nagi has a humid subtropical climate (Köppen climate classification Cfa).

Demographics
Per Japanese census data, the population of Nagi in 2020 is 5,578 people. Nagi has been conducting censuses since 1920.

Child subsidies
As of August 2005, the fertility rate was 1.4 children per woman. Measures were implemented to encourage having more children, including providing free medical care to children aged 18 or under, helping students going to high schools outside the town with their commuting expenses, and providing day care for sick children, as well as providing cheap rental properties and paying birth gifts of up to ¥400,000.

The birthrate briefly increased to 2.8, but then it declined to 1.9.

History 
Nagi is part of ancient Mimasaka Province. After the Meiji restoration, the villages of Kitayoshino, Toyotaand Toyonami were established with  the creation of the modern municipalities system on June 1,1889. These three villages merged on February 1, 1955 to form the town of Nagi.

Government
Nagi has a mayor-council form of government with a directly elected mayor and a unicameral town council of ten members. Nagi, collectively with the city of Tsuyama and the towns of Kagami and Shōō, contributes four members to the Okayama Prefectural Assembly. In terms of national politics, the town is part of the Okayama 3rd district of the lower house of the Diet of Japan.

Economy
The main industry in the area is forestry and agriculture. Wasabi is a noted local product. The Higashiyama Industrial Park is located in the southeastern part of the city.

Education
Nagi has one public elementary school and one public junior high school operated by the town government. The town does not have a high school.

Transportation

Railway 
The JR West Kishin Line runs on the south side of the town, and the Inbi Line runs on the west and north sides of the town; however, Nagi does not have any passenger railway service.  The nearest train station is Tsuyama Station, which can be reached by bus.

Highways 
Nagi is not located on any national expressway or highway. The nearest interchange is the Chugoku Expressway Tsuyama IC/Mimasaka IC.

Local attractions
 Nagi Museum Of Contemporary Art

Notable people from Nagi
 Masashi Kishimoto, creator of the anime/manga series Naruto. The town of Nagi was the inspiration for the village of Konoha, where most of the protagonists of Naruto live.

References

External links

Nagi official website 

Towns in Okayama Prefecture